John Edward McGrath (born 5 September 1962) is a British artistic director and chief executive of Manchester International Festival.

Early life 
John Edward McGrath was born 5 September 1962 in Mold, North Wales and grew up in Liverpool.

Education 
McGrath gained his Ph.D. from the New York University Graduate School of Arts and Science in 1999.

Career 
As a development officer McGrath founded Arts Integrated Merseyside (AIM), a disability arts organisation based in Liverpool, which later became DaDaFest. He also worked as a theatre director in New York, including working as an associate director for Mabou Mines.

He then became the artistic director of the Contact Theatre in Manchester (1999-2008) and the founding artistic director at National Theatre Wales (NTW) (2009 - end of 2015). During his time at the NTW the actor Michael Sheen starred in and was creative director of The Passion, a 72-hour secular passion play staged in Sheen's hometown of Port Talbot, Wales with over 1,000 local residents taking part.

It Gets Better Project 
In 2013 McGrath was interviewed alongside a number of other theatre practitioners in Wales for the It Gets Better Project. The project was set up in response to the suicides of teenagers who were bullied because they were gay or because their peers suspected that they were gay. In the video he states, "I knew that I didn't quite fit in with the right way to be a boy...If you can find ways to be strong and to ask for help when you need help, then people are out there to help you. ... Don't worry also if you don't fit into the new 'profit pattern' of what it is to be gay, there are places and spaces to be a bit different, even from that."

Awards 
 2005 Cultural Leadership Award from the National Endowment for Science Technology and the Arts (NESTA)
 2015 Honorary Doctorate from the Open University

Books 
   ProQuest.

References

External links 
 Manchester International Festival
 

1962 births
Artistic directors
British chief executives
British disability rights activists
LGBT theatre directors
Living people
New York University alumni